Trailokya Malla was a Malla Dynasty King of Bhaktapur, Nepal from 1560 to 1613.

It is believed that he was murdered one night while taking his dinner through poison, which was kept in his dinner foods.

References

Malla rulers of Bhaktapur
1613 deaths
Year of birth unknown
People from Bhaktapur
16th-century Nepalese people
17th-century Nepalese people